Yu-stone may refer to either of two minerals:

Actinolite
Jadeite